Peshawar Cantonment Railway Station (often abbreviated as Peshawar Cantt) is the principal railway station in the Peshawar, Khyber Pakhtunkhwa province of Pakistan. It is located on Saddar Road. The station is staffed and has a booking office.

Facilities
Peshawar Cantonment station will be connected to the future TransPeshawar BRT – Line 1.

Platforms
There are three platforms and seven tracks. The platforms are connected by foot overbridge.

Services
The following trains originate at Peshawar Cantonment station:

See also

References

Railway stations in Peshawar District
Railway stations on Khyber Pass line